Untamagiru (Okinawan: , untamagiruu) is a 1989 Japanese film directed by Gō Takamine. It is a magical realist story of the legendary Okinawan hero Untamagiru participating in efforts to form an independent Okinawa before the island was returned to Japan in 1972. Many of the characters speak in the Okinawan language and thus mainland Japanese spectators needed subtitles to understand it.

Cast 
 Chikako Aoyama
 Kaoru Kobayashi
 John Sayles
 Jun Togawa

Awards and nominations
14th Hochi Film Award 
Won: Best Film

References

External links 

1989 films
Films directed by Gō Takamine
1980s Japanese-language films
Films set in Okinawa Prefecture
1980s Japanese films